The Minister for Social Security and Local Government is a junior ministerial post in the Scottish Government. As a result, the Minister does not attend the Scottish Cabinet. The minister supports the Cabinet Secretary for Social Justice, Housing and Local Government, who has overall responsible for the portfolio.

The Minister for Social Security and Local Government is Ben Macpherson MSP, who was appointed on 20 May 2021.

Overview 
The Minister has responsibility for:

 Housing
 Social security
 Local government
 Planning and building standards
 Business Improvement Districts
 Community planning
 Homelessness
 Regeneration
 Fuel poverty

History
In 2011, the position of Minister for Local Government and Planning was created; the portfolio changed in November 2014 following a reshuffle by Nicola Sturgeon when she became First Minister of Scotland. The post was rebranded at that point to Minister for Local Government and Community Empowerment.

In September 2012, the junior post of Minister for Housing and Welfare was announced, with a portfolio intended to reflect the important role of housing in aiding economic recovery and the challenges that face those in poverty. In May 2016, Nicola Sturgeon reshuffled junior ministers and the post joined local government and housing in a new Minister for Local Government and Housing role. Planning was added to the title in June 2018. The title was changed in May 2021 at the start of the third Sturgeon government, with the post also taking responsibility for social security, which between 2018 and 2021 was the responsibility of a separate cabinet-level post, the Cabinet Secretary for Social Security and Older People.

List of office holders

References

External links 
The Scottish Cabinet on Scottish Government website
Minister for Local Government, Housing and Planning on Scottish Government website

Scottish Parliament
Local Government, Housing and Planning
Local government in Scotland
Town and country planning in Scotland
Community empowerment